This is a list of decisions of the United States Supreme Court that have been abrogated (superseded), in whole or in part, by a subsequent constitutional amendment or Congressional statute. This list does not included decisions overruled by the subsequent Supreme Court decisions.

By Constitutional amendment

By federal statute

Arbitration

Bankruptcy

Crime

Education

Environment

Veterans

Federal courts 
Absolute and qualified immunity

 Anti-Injunction Act

 Magistrates

Private right of action

 Subject-matter jurisdiction

Habeas

Immigration

Labor

Native Americans

Patent

Quiet title

Securities fraud

Tax

Attempted abrogations 

 Mixed results

See also 
 List of overruled U.S. Supreme Court decisions

References 

 William N. Eskridge, Jr., Overriding Supreme Court Statutory Interpretation Decisions, 101  331 (1991).

Abrogated